Vertical is a Japanese novel and manga imprint of Kodansha USA Publishing. Founded in 2001 by Hiroki Sakai, in February 2011, the company was bought by Kodansha (46.7%) and Dai Nippon Printing (46.0%). The company was consolidated into Kodansha USA Publishing in 2020.

Titles
Vertical, Inc. publishes books from a variety of genres, including prose fiction, manga, nonfiction, crafts, and cooking.
Novels
 A Caring Man (Akira Arai)
 A Rabbit's Eyes (Kenjiro Haitani)
 Ashes (Kenzo Kitakata)
 Attack on Titan: Before the Fall (Ryō Suzukaze)
 Attack on Titan: Harsh Mistress of the City (Ryō Kawakami)
 Attack on Titan: Lost Girls (Hiroshi Seko)
 The Blade of the Courtesans (Keiichiro Ryu)
 Body (Asa Nonami)
 The Cage (Kenzo Kitakata)
 The Cat in the Coffin (Mariko Koike)
 City of Refuge (Kenzo Kitakata)
 The Crimson Labyrinth (Yusuke Kishi)
 Edge (Koji Suzuki)
 ENMA the Immortal (Fumi Nakamura)
 Fallout (Tetsuo Takashima)
 The Flowers of Edo (Michael Dana Kennedy)
 Gray Men (Tomotake Ishikawa)
 Guin Saga (Kaoru Kurimoto)
 A Guru is Born (Takeshi Kitano)
 Innocent World (Ami Sakurai)
 KIZUMONOGATARI: Wound Tale (NisiOisiN)
 Kubikiri Cycle (NisiOisiN)
 Lala Pipo (Hideo Okuda)
 May in the Valley of the Rainbow (Yoichi Funado)
 The Mediterranean Trilogy (Shiono Nanami)
 Naoko (Keigo Higashino)
 Now You're One of Us (Asa Nonami)
 Outlet (Randy Taguchi)
 Paradise (Koji Suzuki)
 Parasite Eve (Hideaki Sena)
 The Poison Ape (Arimasa Osawa)
 Pro Bono (Seicho Matsumoto)
 Promenade of the Gods (Koji Suzuki)
 The Ring Trilogy  (Koji Suzuki)
 Sayonara, Gangsters (Genichiro Takahashi)
 Seraph of the End: Guren Ichinose: Catastrophe at Sixteen (Takaya Kagami)
 Seraph of the End: Guren Ichinose: World Resurrection at Nineteen (Takaya Kagami)
 Shinjuku Shark (Arimasa Osawa)
 Summer of the Ubume (Natsuhiko Kyogoku)
 Translucent Tree (Nobuko Takagi)
 Twinkle Twinkle (Kaori Ekuni)
 Winter Sleep (Kenzo Kitakata)
 Zero Over Berlin (Joh Sasaki)

Short story collections
 Birthday (Koji Suzuki)
 Boy (Takeshi Kitano)
 Dark Water (Koji Suzuki)
 Season of Infidelity (Oniroku Dan)

Non-fiction and miscellaneous
 A Slow Death (NHK-TV “Tokaimura Criticality Accident” Crew)
 Aranzi Aranzo
 The Honda Myth (Masaaki Sato)
 Iron Chef Chen's Knockout Chinese (Chen Kenichi)
 J-Horror (David Kalat)
 Nintendo Magic (Osamu Inoue)
 North Korea Kidnapped My Daughter (Sakie Yokota)
 Saying Yes to Japan (Tim Clark, Carl Kay)
 Sayonara, Mr. Fatty! (Toshio Okada)
 Slow Sex Secrets (Adam Tokunaga)
 The Toyota Leaders (Masaaki Sato)
 Walking Your Way to a Better Life (Kimiko)
Manga
 5 Centimeters Per Second (Makoto Shinkai, Yukiko Seike)
 7 Billion Needles (Nobuaki Tadano)
 A School Frozen in Time (Mizuki Tsujimura, Naoshi Arakawa)
 An Older Guy's VR First Love (Tomoko Boryoku)
 After the Rain (Jun Mayuzuki)
 Ajin: Demi-Human (Gamon Sakurai)
 Andromeda Stories (Ryu Mitsuse, Keiko Takemiya)
 Avant-garde Yumeko (Shūzō Oshimi)
 Ayako (Osamu Tezuka)
 Apollo's Song (Osamu Tezuka)
 Black Jack (Osamu Tezuka)
 Blame! (Tsutomu Nihei)
 Blood on the Tracks (Shuzo Oshimi) 
 The Book of Human Insects (Osamu Tezuka)
 Buddha (Osamu Tezuka)
 Cardfight!! Vanguard (Akira Itō)
 Chi's Sweet Home (Kanata Konami)
 CITY (Keiichi Arawi)
 Devil's Line (Ryou Hanada)
 Dissolving Classroom (Junji Ito)
 Don't Toy with Me, Miss Nagatoro (Nanashi)
 Dororo (Osamu Tezuka)
 Dream Fossil (Satosi Kon)
 The Drops of God (Tadashi Agi, Shu Okimoto)
 The Flowers of Evil (Shūzō Oshimi)
 Flying Witch (Chihiro Ishizuka)
 From the New World (Yusuke Kishi)
 The Garden of Words (Makoto Shinkai)
 A Girl on the Shore (Inio Asano)
 Go with the Clouds, North by Northwest (Aki Irie)
 The Gods Lie (Kaori Ozaki)
 The Great Cleric (Broccoli Lion, Hiiro Akikaze)
 GTO: 14 Days in Shonan (Tooru Fujisawa)
 GTO: The Early Years (Tooru Fujisawa)
 The Guin Saga Manga: The Seven Magi (Kaoru Kurimoto, Kazuaki Yanagisawa)
 Helter Skelter (Kyoko Okazaki)
 Heroman (Stan Lee, BONES, Tamon Ohta)
 Immortal Hounds  (Ryō Yasohachi)
 In Clothes Called Fat (Moyoco Anno)
 Insufficient Direction (Moyoco Anno)
 Knights of Sidonia (Tsutomu Nihei)
 Limit (Keiko Suenobu)
 Lychee Light Club (Usamaru Furuya)
 Message to Adolf (Osamu Tezuka)
 Miss Miyazen Would Love to Get Closer to You (Taka Aki)
 Mobile Suit Gundam: The Origin (Yoshikazu Yasuhiko, Yoshiyuki Tomino, Hajime Yatate)
 Mobile Suit Gundam Wing: Endless Waltz - Glory of the Losers (Tomofumi Ogasawara, Katsuyuki Sumisawa)
 Moteki (Mitsuro Kubo)
 Mysterious Girlfriend X (Riichi Ueshiba)
 MW (Osamu Tezuka)
 My Neighbor Seki (Takuma Morishige)
 My Boy (Hitomi Takano) 
 Ninja Slayer (Bradley Bond, Philip "Ninj@" Morzez)
 Nichijou (Keiichi Arawi)
 No Longer Human (Usamaru Furuya)
 Ode to Kirihito (Osamu Tezuka)
 Paradise Kiss (Ai Yazawa)
 Peepo Choo (Felipe Smith)
 Pink (Kyoko Okazaki)
 Princess Knight (Osamu Tezuka)
 Prophecy (Tetsuya Tsutsui)
 Sakuran (Moyoco Anno)
 Sickness Unto Death (Takahiro Seguchi)
 Summer Wars (Mamoru Hosoda)
 To Terra... (Keiko Takemiya)
 Tokyo ESP (Hajime Segawa)
 Tropic of the Sea (Satoshi Kon)
 The Twin Knights (Osamu Tezuka)
 To the Abandoned Sacred Beasts (Maybe)
 Twin Spica (Kou Yaginuma)
 Utsubora: The Story of a Novelist (Asumiko Nakamura)
 Velveteen & Mandala (Jiro Matsumoto)
 What Did You Eat Yesterday? (Fumi Yoshinaga)
 Witchcraft Works (Ryu Mizunagi)
 Wolfsmund (Mitsuhisa Kuji)

References

External links

 Kodansha USA Homepage

2001 establishments in the United States
Publishing companies established in 2001
Privately held companies based in New York City
Comic book publishing companies of the United States
Manga distributors